San Miguel de Pallaques is a town in northern Peru, capital of San Miguel Province in Cajamarca Region.

Populated places in the Cajamarca Region